F. Michael Burkett Jr. (born June 7, 1948) is an American attorney and Democratic politician from Idaho.

A 1970 graduate of the United States Air Force Academy, Burkett served in the U.S. Air Force and then earned his Juris Doctor degree from the University of Idaho College of Law in 1979. He is currently a partner with Huntley Park, LLP in Boise.

Burkett first won election to the Idaho Legislature in 1988 by defeating Republican Senate President Pro Tempore Jim Risch in one of the state's most significant political upsets that year. He served in the state senate from 1989 to 1992.

In 1994, Burkett was an unsuccessful candidate for attorney general, losing to Republican nominee Alan G. Lance in the general election in November.

In 2002, Burkett was reelected to the state senate from District 19, which includes the North End neighborhood of Boise. The district is one of only a few in the state which routinely votes for Democrats over Republicans.

Burkett was not a candidate for reelection in 2008, and was succeeded by Democratic legislator Nicole LeFavour.

References

External links
Idaho Legislature - Senator Mike Burkett official government site
Project Vote Smart - Senator Michael Burkett (ID) profile
Follow the Money - Mike Burkett
2006 2004 2002 1992 1990 State Senate campaign contributions
1994 Attorney General campaign contributions

1948 births
Living people
United States Air Force Academy alumni
Democratic Party Idaho state senators
Idaho lawyers
University of Idaho alumni
People from Keosauqua, Iowa
Military personnel from Iowa